Laurence Kelly (28 April 1925 – 1972)  was an English professional footballer who played as a defender in the Football League for Wolverhampton Wanderers and Huddersfield Town.

He signed amateur forms for his home-town club in 1940 and made his first-team debut in the 1942–43 season in the Wartime League (North), with seven appearances in all. He first played in the Football League in 1947–48. However Wolves were then at the start of a period of dominance in the First Division and  Kelly was not a regular first team player; he made 60 league appearances in three seasons. In October 1950 he was persuaded to move to Huddersfield who had had difficulties with the left back position. He made the position his own for the next six years, during which he was a member of the Huddersfield Town defence which was ever-present through the 1952–53 season. He made 239 first team appearances in all, playing five seasons in the First Division and two in the Second. Huddersfield also reached the quarter-final of the F.A. Cup during this period.

In 1956–57 it was Huddersfield's policy to reduce the average age of the team and Kelly lost his place to the up-and-coming Ray Wilson. At the end of the season he moved to play for and manage non-league club Nuneaton Borough. He resigned from that post in December 1958.

References

Huddersfield Town: A Complete Record 1910–1990, Terry Frost, Breedon Books 1990
Huddersfield Town, 75 Years On. G.S. Binns, Huddersfield Town AFC, 1984
99 Years and Counting – Huddersfield Town Centenary History by A.Hodgson, G.&I. Thomas and J.Ward, Huddersfield Town AFC, 2007
Soccer at War 1939–45, Jack Rollin, Willow Books, 1985

1925 births
1972 deaths
Footballers from Wolverhampton
English footballers
Association football defenders
Wolverhampton Wanderers F.C. players
Huddersfield Town A.F.C. players
Nuneaton Borough F.C. players
English Football League players